Pavel Kadeřábek (born 25 April 1992) is a Czech professional footballer who plays as a right-back for Bundesliga club 1899 Hoffenheim and played eight years for the Czech Republic national team. He previously represented his country at under-19 level and was in the Czech squad for the 2011 UEFA European Under-19 Championship, where he played all five of his country's matches.

Club career
In August 2010, Kadeřábek made his first competitive appearance for Sparta Prague in a play-off match in the 2010–11 UEFA Champions League qualifying phase and play-off round, coming on as a 61st-minute substitute against MŠK Žilina.

In August 2011, having previously only played league football in the Czech 2. Liga for Sparta's reserve team, Kadeřábek went out on loan to Czech First League side Viktoria Žižkov.

On 17 June 2015, he joined Hoffenheim on a four-year deal.

International career
Kadeřábek joined up with the Czech under-21 team for the first time ahead of a match against the Netherlands in August 2013. He represented the Czech U21 team at the 2015 UEFA European Under-21 Championship, and scored the opening goal of the tournament in a 1–2 loss to Denmark at the Eden Arena in Prague.

Kadeřábek made his national debut for the Czech Republic on 21 May 2014 in a friendly match against Finland. He scored his first goal for the Czech Republic in a 2–1 UEFA Euro 2016 qualifying win against Iceland on 16 November 2014.

In June 2016 Kadeřábek was included in coach Pavel Vrba's 23-man squad for the UEFA Euro 2016 tournament in France.

On 10 March 2022 Kadeřabek announced end of his international career due to health reasons.

Personal life
Kadeřábek started a relationship with Czech Miss  in 2014. The couple have a daughter Ema born on 2 September 2016. They got married in June 2017.

Career statistics

Club

International

International goals
Scores and results list Czech Republic's goal tally first.

Honours 
AC Sparta Praha
 Czech Cup: 2013–14
 Czech First League: 2013–14

Czech Republic U19
 UEFA European Under-19 Championship runner-up: 2011

References

External links

1992 births
Living people
Footballers from Prague
Association football fullbacks
Czech footballers
Czech Republic youth international footballers
Czech Republic under-21 international footballers
Czech Republic international footballers
Czech First League players
Czech National Football League players
Bundesliga players
TSG 1899 Hoffenheim players
FK Viktoria Žižkov players
AC Sparta Prague players
UEFA Euro 2016 players
UEFA Euro 2020 players
Czech expatriate footballers
Czech expatriate sportspeople in Germany
Expatriate footballers in Germany